Dervenochoria is a former municipality in Boeotia, Greece. Since the 2011 local government reform it is part of the municipality Tanagra, of which it is a municipal unit. In 2011 its population was 1,869. The municipal unit has an area of 222.938 km2. It covers the southernmost portion of Boeotia. The main village is Pyli.

Subdivisions
The municipal unit Dervenochoria is subdivided into the following communities (constituent villages in brackets):
Dafni
Pyli (Pyli, Panaktos, Prasino)
Skourta
Stefani

History
The municipality was created in 1997.

Most of Dervenochoria was hit by a devastating wildfire (see 2007 Greek forest fires) on Thursday June 28, 2007 that came from Parnitha westward.  Some damages to property including houses and buildings were reported.  The aftermath was that much of the forest turned into an ashy landscape that may take years to restore its natural beauty.

References

External links
 Dervenochori on the GTP Travel Pages

 
Populated places in Boeotia